The Martha and Spencer Love School of Business is part of Elon University in Elon, North Carolina. The undergraduate school offers degrees in Bachelor of Science in Accounting, the Bachelor of Science in Business Administration, and the Bachelor of Arts in Economics. Minors are also offered in Accounting, Business Administration and Economics. The school offers concentrations in Entrepreneurship, Healthcare Administration, Human Resources, International Business, Leadership/Management, Marketing, and Supply Chain Management. The graduate school offers a Master of Business Administration.

History
The Martha and Spencer Love School of Business was established in 1985 following an endowment gift from The Martha and Spencer Love Foundation. The Love School of Business is based in Ernest A. Koury, Sr. Business Center, which opened in 2006. Richard W. Sankey Hall, an expansion of the Love School of Business, opened in fall 2018.

The Martha and Spencer Love School of Business earned initial accreditation by AACSB in 2004.

Academics

Graduate Programs
Master of Business Administration
Master of Science in Business Analytics
Master of Science in Accounting

Undergraduate Majors
Accounting
Business Analytics
Economic Consulting
Economics
Entrepreneurship
Finance
Human resource Management
International Business
Marketing
Project Management
Supply Chain Management

Undergraduate Minors
Accounting
Business Administration
Economics
Entrepreneurship
Finance
Professional Sales
Supply Chain Management

Undergraduate Centers & Programs
Business Fellows Program
Chandler Family Professional Sales Center
Doherty Center for Creativity, Innovation & Entrepreneurship
William Gerrard Reed Finance Center
Center for Financial Literacy
Center for Organizational Analytics
Porter Family Professional Development Center
Innovation Scholars
International Business Dual Degree Program
Accelerated 3+1 Dual Degree Program
Underrepresented Business Student Alliance Network 
PRME: Principles for Responsible Management and Education

Student organizations
Alpha Kappa Psi
American Marketing Association
Beta Alpha Psi
Beta Gamma Sigma
Delta Sigma Pi
Economics Club
Elon Blockchain
Elon Consulting Club
Elon Microfinance Initiative 
Omicron Delta Epsilon International Economics Honor Society
Financial Management Association International
Net Impact
Project Management Club
Real Estate Club
Sigma Iota Epsilon
Society for Human Resource Management
Women in Finance
Women in Sales

Recognition and rankings
The Elon MBA is ranked among the Top 100 schools in the U.S. News & World Report's “Best Part-time MBA Programs” list for 2022.
The Princeton Review named Elon MBA as one of the country’s best on-campus MBA programs in its “Best Business Schools for 2021” guide of top graduate business programs.
In 2021, Elon’s undergraduate business program ranks No. 45 in the survey by Poets & Quants, a ranking that includes private and public institutions of all sizes. Among private colleges and universities, Elon’s program ranked No. 23.
In 2014, Princeton Review's Best 301 Business Schools ranked Martha and Spencer Love School of Business 2nd in the United States for Best Administered MBA Program.
In 2013, BusinessWeek evaluated graduate business schools across the nation and, in the category of part-time MBA programs, the Martha and Spencer Love School of Business was ranked 1st in North Carolina, 1st in the Southeast, and 5th in the United States.

See also
List of business schools in the United States

References

Business schools in North Carolina
Elon University
Educational institutions established in 1985
1985 establishments in North Carolina